The Utah State Historical Society (USHS), founded in 1897 and now part of the Government of Utah's Division of State History, encourages the research, study, and publication of Utah history. Since 1928, the USHS has also published the Utah Historical Quarterly, a journal covering a variety of topics in Utah history.

Almost lost amid the parades, speeches, and other kinetic exciting of Utah's Golden Jubilee in July 1897 was the meeting of a few dozen Utahns at the Templeton Hotel in Salt Lake City to create the state historical society. Yet, when the last float was nothing more than a fading image in a wide-eyed child's memory and the final hyperbolic speech had dissipated into the summer air, the organizational work of those history-minded visionaries was already beginning to prove itself as the greatest legacy of that grand celebration.

From its modest beginnings, the Utah State Historical Society has grown to several thousand members, developed a research collection of over a million items, published over 300 issues of the Utah Historical Quarterly, led the historic preservation movement in Utah for nearly fifty years, created energetic antiquities and museums programs, and much more.

In 2014, the Utah Historical Society launched a fresh, newly designed Utah Historical Quarterly and free online "extras" to make the Utah Division of State History's existing assets - including I Love History, History to Go, the entire run of the quarterly since 1928, and a vast collection of scholarship - increasingly accessible and useful to students, scholars, and the general public.

References

.
.
.
.
.
.
.

External links

1897 establishments in Utah
Government of Utah
Historical societies in Utah
 
Utah State Historical Society
Organizations established in 1897
State history organizations of the United States
State historical societies of the United States